An array is a systematic arrangement of similar objects, usually in rows and columns.

Things called an array include:

Music 
 In twelve-tone and serial composition, the presentation of simultaneous twelve-tone sets such that the sums of their horizontal segments form a succession of twelve-tone aggregates
 Array mbira, a musical instrument
 Spiral array model, a music pitch space

Science

Astronomy 
A telescope array, also called astronomical interferometer.

Biology 
 Various kinds of multiple biological arrays called microarrays
 Visual feature array, a model for the visual cortex

Computer science 
Generally, a collection of same type data items that can be selected by indices computed at run-time, including:

 Array (data structure), an arrangement of items at equally spaced addresses in computer memory
 Array (data type), used in a programming language to specify a variable that can be indexed
 Associative array, an abstract data structure model composed of key-value pairs, often implemented as a hash table or search tree
or various kinds of the above, such as:
 Bit array or bit vector
 Dynamic array, allocated at run time
 Jagged array, a multidimensional array where the rows have different lengths individually
 Parallel array of records, with each field stored as a separate array
 Sparse array, with most elements omitted, to store a sparse matrix
 Variable-length array

or various related concepts:
 Array programming, using matrix algebra notation in programs (not the same as array processing)
 Array slicing, the extraction of sub-arrays of an array

or also:
 Global Arrays, a library for parallel processing
 Intel Array Visualizer, a piece of scientific graphics software

Mathematics and statistics 
 A standard array in coding theory
 An array or matrix (mathematics)
 a Costas array
 a Monge array
 A holor
 In statistics, arrays are a name for some kinds of :Category:Experimental design
 Intersection array a concept of category theory

Technology

Computing
 Array data structure, an arrangement of data in computer memory
 Asynchronous array of simple processors
 Disk array, such as the RAID
 Gate array, including a field-programmable gate array (FPGA)
 ICL Distributed Array Processor, an array processor for the ICL
 Integrated circuit packages:
 Ball grid array
 pin grid array
 land grid array
 Processor array
 Programmable Array Logic (PAL), a systematic way to implement boolean functions
 Reconfigurable datapath array, a flexible data processing architecture
 Systolic array, a hardware architecture
 Transistor array, an integrated circuit
 Video Graphics Array (VGA), a display adapter and many variants thereof
 Wi-Fi array, a wireless networking device

Other technologies
 Antenna array
 Array gain, a telecommunications parameter
 Array processing of multichannel signals (not to be confused with array programming)
 Color filter array, placed over an imaging array
 Field emitter array, an electron source
 Halbach array, an arrangement of magnets
 Linear diode array used in image scanners
 Microphone array
 Parametric array of transducers
 Phased-array optics
 Photovoltaic array
 Staring array, an imaging sensor
 Towed array sonar

Other 
 A Commission of Array, a commission for mustering a militia
 ARRAY, an independent film distribution company
 Array Networks, a computer networking company
Array Collective, a Belfast-based artist-activist collaborative project